"Snobbery and Decay" is the debut single by Act.

According to Claudia Brücken, "The whole idea was based on a programme called Lifestyles of the Rich and Famous. That was when we discovered how much we wanted to write about that idea and what a great introduction it would be for Thomas and me to have a duet as a first single. Two characters talking about that whole thing."

The orchestral arrangement for "Snobbery and Decay" was made by David Bedford. 

A number of remixes were prepared by the producers and appeared across the various formats, the standard extended version titled "Snobbery And Decay (That's Entertainment!)", "Snobbery & Decay (Extended, For Stephanie Beacham)" and "(The Naked Civil) Snobbery & Decay". Further 'Moonlighting' and 'Instant' remixes by Mastermind Herbie appeared only on a promotional 12".

"Snobbery and Decay" was included on the group's sole album Laughter, Tears and Rage, released 7 weeks later. Compared to the single version, the album version adds a minute of instrumental to the end. The B-side "Poison" appears only on CD and cassette formats (not on LP) and is a different mix. Although the album has been reissued twice on CD in different, vastly expanded formats, the 7" versions of "Snobbery and Decay" and "Poison" remain unreleased on an Act CD. The last 4 minutes of the 12" version "Snobbery and Decay (That's Entertainment!)" do contain the 7" version of "Snobbery" – except for the string intro.

The 12" and cassette versions also feature a cover of "I'd Be Surprisingly Good for You" from the musical Evita, chosen according to Thomas Leer, because "we both dislike Andrew Lloyd Webber intensely. We wanted to do something from a musical, something that was crap and that we could make great. It also fitted the idea of the package."

Several different picture sleeves were issued with the various formats, some feature photos of Quentin Crisp, author of "The Naked Civil Servant", and Liberace.

The 12" version "Snobbery and Decay (That's Entertainment!)" includes a sample of Liza Minnelli's dialogue from the 1972 musical film Cabaret, followed by one from American comedian Joan Rivers.

"You've got yours, I've got mine, Obsession, just like Calvin Klein .."

Track listing 
All songs written and composed by Thomas Leer and Claudia Brücken, except where noted.

7" vinyl 
 UK: ZTT / ZTAS 28
 Europe: Island / 109 105

Cassette 
 UK: ZTT / CTIS 28 (titled "Snobbery & Decay (cabaret-cassette)")

12" vinyl 

Titled "Act present Showtime / Snobbery & Decay (That's entertainment..)
 UK: ZTT / 12ZACT 28 (limited edition in gatefold sleeve)
 UK: ZTT / 12ZTAS 28
 Europe: Island / 609 105
 Spain: Island / 3A 609105

Titled "Snobbery and Decay (naked civil 12")"
 UK: ZTT / 12 XACT 28 (initial copies came with an Act poster)

 UK: ZTT / CT 01 (promo only, remixes by Mastermind Herbie)

CD 
Titled "compacted Snobbery & Decay / Emotional highlights from Snobbery & Decay"
 UK: ZTT / CID 28

References

External links 
 

1987 songs
1987 debut singles
Act (band) songs
Song recordings produced by Stephen Lipson
ZTT Records singles